Minnesota State Highway 169 (MN 169) is a  highway in northeast Minnesota, which runs from its interchange with U.S. Highway 53 in Wuori Township (immediately north of the city of Virginia) and continues northeast to its northern terminus at the intersection of Lake County Road 18 and Power Dam Road in Fall Lake Township (6-miles east of Ely).  State Highway 169 becomes Lake County Road 18 at this point.

State Highway 169 is numbered as an extension of U.S. Highway 169, using the same mileage that began at the Iowa state line.

Route description

State Highway 169 serves as a north–south route in northeast Minnesota between the cities of Virginia, Tower, Ely, and Winton.

The route passes through the Superior National Forest at two different points.

Soudan Underground Mine State Park is located near State Highway 169, two miles east of Tower.

Bear Head Lake State Park is located 7 miles south of the junction of State Highway 169 and County Road 128 (in Eagles Nest Township, 9 miles east of Tower). The park entrance is located on County Road 128.

State Highway 169 is one of three Minnesota state marked highways to carry the same number as an existing U.S. marked highway within the state, the others being Highways 61 and 65.

History

State Highway 169 was numbered as an extension of U.S. 169.

The route was authorized on April 22, 1933 from the city of Virginia to the junction with Highway 135 (formerly 35) in Tower, where the highway terminated until 1953.

The six-mile (10 km) segment running from Ely to Fall Lake Township was authorized in 1949 and originally designated State Highway 221 until 1953, when State Highway 169 was extended over State Highway 1 to Ely.

Highway 169 was paved by 1940.  The segment east of Ely was paved by 1950.

Major intersections

References

169
Transportation in St. Louis County, Minnesota
Transportation in Lake County, Minnesota
Ely, Minnesota
U.S. Route 169